A Respiratory Care Act is a common term for a law enacted allowing for the practice of Respiratory Care in a given state, province, region or nation.  The name of the law may differ slightly but typically Respiratory Care is the identifier title.

Board of Respiratory Care
A board of respiratory care is typically a division of that states Department of Health, much like a Board of Nursing or Board of Medicine.  Granting licenses to applicants and reviewing policy related to practice and care.

United States Congress notable acts

Medicare Respiratory Therapy Initiative Act
Medicare Respiratory Therapy Initiative Act - Amends title XVIII (Medicare) of the Social Security Act to cover the services of a qualified respiratory practitioner performed under the general supervision of a physician.
H.R. 3968: Medicare Respiratory Therapy Initiative Act of 2007 — Result: Died in committee
S. 2704: Medicare Respiratory Therapy Initiative Act of 2008 — Result: Died in committee
S. 343: Medicare Respiratory Therapy Initiative Act of 2009 — Result: Died in committee
H.R. 941: Medicare Respiratory Therapy Initiative Act of 2011 — Currently in committee

References

Respiratory therapy